The Manulife Centre is located on the southeast corner of Bay and Bloor streets, along the Mink Mile and adjacent to the southern edge of the Yorkville district of Toronto, Ontario, Canada. It consists of a 51-storey 800-suite luxury residential tower at 44 Charles Street and a shorter tower at 55 Bloor Street West, connected by a retail complex on the main floor and basement.

History
Designed by the Toronto architectural firm of Clifford and Lawrie Architects, construction began in 1972 and was completed in 1974. It was developed and built for Manulife Financial, the current owners. Early retail tenants at the Manulife Centre included Bretton's department store (60,000 square feet), Creed's (38,000 square feet), Harridge's, and other luxury tenants. Over time, these three large retailers went bankrupt and closed.

Today
Today the retail portion of Manulife Centre serves the local population, and includes Birks and Indigo Books. Bay Bloor Radio, which was founded in 1946, moved into the Manulife Centre when it opened and remains there today. A tunnel connects the basement level of the shopping concourse to Holt Renfrew at 50 Bloor Street West on the north side of Bloor. 

Manulife Centre is home to Canada's first flagship Eataly location as well as notable Yorkville fashion retailer, Over the Rainbow, and Shoppers Drug Mart. 

The tower is served by Bay Station on the TTC's Line 2 Bloor–Danforth. Tunnels from the Manulife Centre provide access to Toronto's busiest subway station Bloor–Yonge.

See also
 The One Eighty which is on the top of the Manulife Centre.
 List of tallest buildings in Toronto
 List of tallest buildings in Canada

References

External links
 Manulife Centre - Shopping 
 44 Charles - Residential

Skyscrapers in Toronto
Shopping malls in Toronto
Brutalist architecture in Canada
Residential skyscrapers in Canada
Residential buildings completed in 1974
1974 establishments in Ontario